Baitu (Pakto; Paitu) is a town in Gaoyao District, Guangdong, China.

References

Gaoyao
Towns in Guangdong